Brewington is an English surname. Notable people with this surname include:

 Howard J. Brewington, American astronomer
 Jamie Brewington, American baseball player
 Jim Brewington, American football player
 Ron Brewington, American broadcaster
Thomas Brewington, American professional wrestler